The Endless Summer Tour was the third headlining concert tour by American recording artist Lana Del Rey in support of her third studio album, Ultraviolence (2014). The tour began on May 7, 2015, in The Woodlands, Texas and concluded on June 16, 2015, in West Palm Beach, Florida finishing with a total of twenty shows over the span of two months. The first seven shows of the tour were supported by fellow alternative rock singer Courtney Love, while the majority of the remaining tour dates were supported by synthpop singer and producer, Grimes. Most of the tour dates were sold out instantly.

Lana Del Rey performed songs from Born to Die, Paradise, and Ultraviolence, in addition to some previously unreleased songs, and covers. By the end of 2015, the tour placed at number 156 on Pollstars "2015 Year-End Top 200 North American Tours" list, grossing $6 million from 16 shows.

Background 

Prior to the release of Ultraviolence (2014), Del Rey performed a series of concerts across North America in April and May 2014. Included in this slew of concerts were two performances at the Coachella Valley Music and Arts Festival, the first in which Del Rey premiered "West Coast", the lead single off of Ultraviolence. After the release of Ultraviolence, Del Rey then went on to perform at various music festivals across Europe during June, July, and August 2014 before canceling the remainder of her promotional concerts due to health issues. After recovering from her illness, Del Rey went on to finish her promotional concert tour by performing two shows at the Hollywood Forever Cemetery in Los Angeles in October 2014. After the completion of the promotional tour, there was much speculation as to if there would be a proper concert tour in support of the singer's latest studio album.

During an interview with the Australian press in July 2014, Courtney Love, former frontwoman of the punk rock band Hole, expressed an interest in collaborating with artists such as Miley Cyrus and Lana Del Rey. When speaking of the possibility of a duet between her and Del Rey, she exclaimed that "I [Love] have a distinctive voice and it might sound cool if it's the right song". Within the following months, Love continued to hint at a collaboration between her and Del Rey publicly through her Twitter account tagging Del Rey in a tweet and stating that there was "exciting news to come".

On December 1, 2014, the tour was officially announced with seventeen shows scheduled across North America in the summer of the following year. Along with the tour's announcement came news that Love would be co-headlining the first eight shows with Del Rey to promote her upcoming solo release. Presale tickets for the tour began shortly after the tour's announcement on December 3, 2014, which was then followed by the general public sale beginning after that on December 6, 2014. Four months later, on April 1, 2015, Del Rey announced that synthpop singer and producer Grimes would be joining her on the remaining dates of the tour after Love departed from the tour.

Set list 
This set list is representative of the show on May 7, 2015, in The Woodlands, Texas. It does not represent all dates throughout the tour.

 "Cruel World" 
 "Cola"
 "Blue Jeans"
 "West Coast"
 "Us Against the World"
 "Born to Die"
 "Ultraviolence"
 "Summertime Sadness"
 "Chelsea Hotel No. 2"
 "Brooklyn Baby"
 "Shades of Cool"
 "You Can Be the Boss"
 "Serial Killer"
 "Video Games"
 "Why Don't You Do Right?"
 "Off to the Races"

Shows

Cancelled shows

Notes

References 

2015 concert tours
Courtney Love
Lana Del Rey concert tours
Concert tours of North America
Concert tours of the United States
Concert tours of Canada